The Moravče Valley is a geographical feature in Central Slovenia

Geography 
A part of the Posavje folds, the Moravče valley reaches to Moravče and is composed of 
sediments of tertiary nature. Of predominance are various sandstones, sands and Miocene Era
marlaceous clays. Beneath the rock, layers exist of mostly dolomized limestone, dolomites and
Early Jurassic and Upper Triassic limestone.

References

Valleys of Slovenia